Pony is an unincorporated community in Greene Township, Jay County, Indiana.

History
A post office was established at Pony in 1886, and remained in operation until it was discontinued in 1900. The community might have taken its name from the nearby stream Pony Run.

Geography

References

Unincorporated communities in Jay County, Indiana
Unincorporated communities in Indiana